Dhudial is a village and union council,an administrative subdivision,of Chakwal District in the Punjab Province of Pakistan,it is part of Chakwal Tehsil. It is one of the largest villages of Chakwal District and is located at 33°3'52N 72°58'24E about 70 km south of the capital Islamabad.Members of the Kassar tribe make up the bulk of the population.It is one of a cluster of villages such as Balkassar, Chawli, Mangwal and Balokassar, which were from the tribal homeland of the Kassar.

Population

It is one the biggest village by population in district Chakwal. Almost having 50000 population. It is known for making industrial area for agricultural machinery.

References

Union councils of Chakwal District
Populated places in Chakwal District